Norris Henry Young (15 August 1887 – 10 February 1974) was a Pitcairnese politician. He served as Chief Magistrate of Pitcairn Island between 1945 and 1948.

Biography
Young was born on Pitcairn in 1887, the son of Bert James Christian and Margaret Augusta Young. He married Marian Elmira Christian in January 1910. The couple had two children, Henry Hugh (born 1909) and Everett Carlyle (1910). Young also had children with Millie Flora Coffin (a son named Watson Rhodes Coffin born in 1924) and Elenor Warren (a daughter named Murial Joyce Warren born in 1928).

Between 1947 and 1950 he served as Chief Magistrate. He died in 1974.

References

1887 births
1974 deaths
Pitcairn Islands politicians